ESAB, Elektriska Svetsnings-Aktiebolaget, is an American Swedish industrial company.

The ultimate parent company of ESAB is ESAB Corporation, a New York Stock Exchange listed (Ticker: ESAB) with its principal executive office in North Bethesda, Maryland U.S.A. On February 22, 2022 ESAB Corporation "ESAB" filed a Form 10-12B registration statement "the Form 10" with the U.S. Securities and Exchange Commission for a spin-off from Colfax Corp. ESAB started the registration process with a series of confidential filings with the SEC starting in August 2021. ESAB is incorporated in Delaware and maintains its principal executive offices in North Bethesda, Maryland U.S.A. The Form 10 states that Colfax intends to distribute "...90% of the outstanding shares of ESAB common stock to current Colfax stockholders." 

ESAB Corporation's portfolio includes a fabrication technology arm, which includes welding, cutting, gas control, PPE, software, and robotic equipment and a separate gas control portfolio focused on healthcare, industrial, and specialty gas control solutions.

History
The company was founded by Oscar Kjellberg. In 1904 he pioneered the development of manual metal arc welding electrodes in Gothenburg, Sweden. The company sells equipment used in welding and cutting.

Other notable CEO was Lars Westerberg who ran ESAB for three years.

The ESAB was acquired by Charter International in 1994.

The ESAB group was acquired by Colfax Corporation on 13 January 2012.

Following the purchase, the CEO of Colfax, Clay Kiefaber, stepped down to the president role of ESAB and was replaced by Steve Simms.

The ESAB group acquired the Welding Wire business of Sandvik effective February 1, 2018. The acquisition included production units in Scranton, PA, and Sandviken, Sweden; the technical sales and product management organization; as well as multiyear strategic collaboration on R&D for future product developments.

ESAB became a publicly traded, independent company under ESAB Corporation on April 5, 2022 following the spin-off from Colfax. Shyam Kambeyanda was appointed President and Chief Executive Officer of the new corporation. 

On October 17, 2022, ESAB Corporation announced the acquisition of Ohio Medical, a global leader in oxygen regulators and central gas systems for the healthcare industry.

References

External links 



Companies established in 1904
Companies listed on the New York Stock Exchange
Companies based in Montgomery County, Maryland